Journal of Chinese Political Science (JCPS) is a hybrid open access peer-reviewed academic journal published quarterly by Springer Nature on behalf of the Association of Chinese Political Studies, covering theoretical and empirical research articles on Chinese politics across the whole spectrum of political science. Its editors-in-chief is Sujian Guo. It is abstracted and indexed by Social Sciences Citation Index and Scopus.

See also 
The Chinese Journal of International Politics

References

Political science journals
Springer Science+Business Media academic journals
Quarterly journals
Academic journals about politics of China
English-language journals